Owen Cowley (14 December 1868 – 27 February 1922) was an Australian cricketer. He played eleven first-class matches for New South Wales and Queensland between 1893/94 and 1896/97.

All of Cowley's first-class cricket was played in New Zealand: seven matches on New South Wales' tour of 1893-94, and four on Queensland's tour of 1896-97. He made his only first-class century for Queensland against Hawke's Bay, when he went to the wicket at 214 for 5 and scored 135, adding 238 for the sixth wicket with Robert MacDonald, who scored 114.

See also
 List of New South Wales representative cricketers

References

External links
 

1868 births
1922 deaths
Australian cricketers
New South Wales cricketers
Queensland cricketers